Viola rostrata, commonly called the long-spurred violet, is an herbaceous plant in the violet family (Violaceae). It is native to eastern North America, where it is found in Canada and the United States, primarily in the Northeastern, Midwestern, and Appalachian regions. Its natural habitat is acidic mesic forests, often growing near Tsuga canadensis.

Description
It is a stemmed perennial plant. The cauline leaves are simple, toothed, ovate and acute. Basal leaves are cordate and 2–4 cm. It produces flowers in the spring. The flowers are beardless, pale lilac with darker veins forming a darker centre eye. The spur is at least as long as the petal blades.

Hybrids
Viola rostrata is  known to hybridize with Viola conspersa (American dog-violet) and Viola striata (creamy violet).

References

External links
 USDA Plants Database profile: Viola rostrata

rostrata
Flora of New Jersey
Flora without expected TNC conservation status